Rogla Ski Resort is a Slovenian ski resort opened in 1975 at Rogla, Zreče, located at the top of the Zreče Pohorje range and regularly the most or second most visited Slovenian ski resort, with over 200,000 skiers per season and capacity of 13,500/h.

Two outdoor stadiums and a multipurpose indoor sports hall, are one of the highest elevation stadiums/indoor arenas in Europe. Resort offers many activities, such as alpine skiing, cross-country skiing, squash, snowboarding, hiking, climbing wall, soccer, handball, basketball, athletics, mountain bike downhill, horseback riding, swimming, fitness, tennis, dog sledding, a forest canopy trail, and an alpine coaster.

The Rogla Olympic Center (Olimpijski športni center Rogla), used as high-elevation training camp, has hosted many prominent sports teams and athletes, such as Monica Seles, Goran Ivanišević, Petra Majdič, Goran Dragić, Paris Saint-Germain, Panathinaikos F.C., the Spain men's national handball team, and the France men's national handball team.

They are firmly a part of FIS Snowboard World Cup calendar hosting parallel giant slalom events since 2013; and FIS Cross-Country World Cup (2009, 2011).

History

Early years
Early tourism dates back to 1928, when the Pesek cabin was opened. The first 10-meter high wooden watchtower was opened in 1934 at the highest point of Rogla, which was destroyed during World War II and replaced with a steel 30-meter high watchtower at the same place in 1956 and which is still standing. As of 2015 this was the highest watchtower in Slovenia.

In 1952 the old cabin was opened for herders only and since 1956 has also been open for tourism. It was the main gathering point at Rogla for many years, where modern tourism started and around which hotels were built is still very popular nowadays. Unior, a blacksmith company from valley lower in Zreče took over the cabin in 1972.

1975: Start of mass tourism
In 1974 Unior's management commissioned studies for the development of Rogla as a ski resort. The road leading to the peak was widened and the first ski lifts were built.

1980: Huge investments
In 1978 construction began on the Hotel Dobrava in Zreče and the Hotel Planja on Rogla. Around Old Cabin they opened Hotel Planja in 1980, with the new ski lifts Mašinžaga and Ostruščica, and by 1981 the Hotel Dobrava had opened, along with a new swimming pool and an athletics and football stadium. In 1983 Hotel Rogla was opened next to Old Cabin.

1985: Jurgovo opened
In 1985 the Jurgovo black ski slopes were opened.

1987: Indor hall and chairlift Planja opened
On 12 December 1987, they opened multipurpose sports indoor hall with first ever squash court in Slovenia and 2-chair lift Planja-Mašinžaga at the same time.

By the 1990s, Rogla had a capacity of over 1,200 beds and ski lifts handling 12,200 skiers per hour. In 1993 the Košuta ski lift was opened.

Between 2000 and 2004, a new Hotel Dobrava was opened, and two four-seat chairlifts were constructed to replaced old and outdated two-seated chairlifts. The artificial snow system was extended and upgraded to make Rogla one of the best ski resorts in Slovenia and the first alpine mountain coaster in Slovenia.

In December 2007 Rogla Fun Park was opened along the Mašinžaga ski slope for skiers and snowboarders.

2009: World Cup debut 
In 2009 FIS Cross-country skiing World Cup events were organized for the first time, repeated two years later.

In October 2010 a new Catholic church was built a top of the mountain. In December 2012 the Jasa II ski lift and slope were opened, intended for snowboard and ski cross.

In June 2014 the new four-star Hotel Natura was opened next to Cross-Country World Cup stadium.

2019: Second watch tower opened
It is only the ninth structure in the world of this kind.

In June 2020, first of this kind in Slovenia, 60 metres long spiral dry slide around outside of 37 meter high wooden Canopy Trail watch tower (Pot med krošnjami).

Ski area

Slopes

Lifts

Winter tourism

Accommodation

Planja Hotel****
Natura Hotel****
Rogla Hotel***
Brinje Hotel***
Jurgovo Hut Suits***
Rogla and Gaber Bungalows***
Jelka Youth Hostel*
Pesek Hut*

Outdoor activities

 Dog sledding
 Summer mountain bike downhill
 Rogla Fun Park - Mašinžaga (terrain park)
 Zlodejevo alpine coaster — 1360 m — 40 km/h (year round)
 Old 30 m steel watch tower at the top (1517 m); opened in 1956
 37 m wooden Canopy Trail (Pot med krošnjami); opened in 2019
 60 m long spiral dry slide around 37 m high watch tower (opened in 2020)

Road access 
 Motorway (Slovenia) — Maribor to Ljubljana (section) — Slovenske Konjice / Tepanje gas station (exit) — Slovenske Konjice — Zreče — Rogla

World Cup

Cross-country skiing

Snowboard

See also 

List of ski areas and resorts in Slovenia

References

External links 
rogla.eu official

Ski areas and resorts in Slovenia
Pohorje
1975 establishments in Yugoslavia